Solnechny Urban Okrug is the name of several municipal formations in Russia. The following administrative divisions are incorporated as such:
Closed Administrative-Territorial Formation of Solnechny, Krasnoyarsk Krai
Closed Administrative-Territorial Formation of Solnechny, Tver Oblast

See also
Solnechny (disambiguation)

References